Lodigiano may refer to:

 Any of a number of communes and institutions in the Italian city (and province) of Lodi
 Lodigiano, a type of Western Lombard dialect